Six ships of the British Royal Navy have been named Coventry, after the city of Coventry in the West Midlands.

  was the Spanish 28-gun ship San Miguel, captured in 1658, but in turn taken by the French in 1666
  was a 48-gun fourth-rate ship-of-the-line launched in 1695, captured by the French in 1704 but soon recaptured, and broken up in 1709
  was a 28-gun  sixth-rate frigate launched in 1757, captured by the French in 1783, and struck in 1786
  was a  light cruiser launched in 1916 and sunk in an air attack in 1942
 HMS Coventry was intended as a Type 61 frigate that was ordered but then deferred by the 1957 Defence White Paper; when the ship was finally confirmed it was instead built as the  
  was a Type 42 destroyer launched in 1974 and lost in the Falklands War
  was a Type 22 frigate launched in 1986 and sold to Romania in 2003

Battle honours
Quiberon Bay 1759
Trincomalee 1782
Norway 1940
Atlantic 1940
Spartivento 1940
Greece 1941
Crete 1941
Libya 1941
Mediterranean 1941
Falklands 1982

Royal Navy ship names